Dietzia alimentaria is a Gram-positive and non-motile bacterium from the genus Dietzia which has been isolated from salt-fermented seafood from Sokcho in Korea.

References

Further reading

External links
Type strain of Dietzia alimentaria at BacDive -  the Bacterial Diversity Metadatabase	

Mycobacteriales
Bacteria described in 2011